Reginald Ernest Bolton (13 November 1945 – 14 July 2006) was a clown, teacher, actor and writer. Bolton's 1987 book New Circus has been called "seminal," and influenced a generation of performers. He used the circus for education and community development, working with the children on the streets of the Craigmillar estate in Edinburgh.

Life
Reg was born in Margate, England. He was educated at the University of Warwick, where he studied English and European literature. In 2004 he completed a PhD, Why Circus Works: how the values and structures of circus make it a significant developmental experience for young people, at Murdoch University in Perth, Western Australia.

He married Annie Stainer, a dancer, mime and clown, with whom he had two children, Jo and Sophie.

Work
Reg worked tirelessly with children and communities both in the United Kingdom, and in Australia where he settled with his family in 1985. He owned and ran the Circus Shop, selling a range of circus equipment such as juggling gear and unicycles. He was a pioneer in the area of educational community circuses.

He wrote and produced many works, including:

1983  	Circus in a suitcase. A practical manual. New York
1987 	New circus. A world survey. London. Occasional journal Suitcase Circus News.
1988 	Videos Circus skills and School circus
1992 	Video Safe circus
1995-98 Regular columnist for Laugh-Makers (USA) and Pro-Circus (Australia)
1996-04 Occasional contributor to Spectacle
1998 	Showtime. Best-selling children's book, (Premier's Book Award, 2000)
1999 	Paper on Circus as Education in Australasian Drama Studies
2001 	Keynote Speaker, Festival of American Youth Circus Organisation, Sarasota, Florida. Theme: Circus to save the world.
2002 	Intensity in tent city. Leeds University, England
2003 Keynote Speaker, International Clowns Symposium, Weston super Mare, England. Clown abuse.
2003 	Article: 'The Philosopher on the Flying Trapeze'. Discourse, San Francisco.
2003 	The wisdom of clowns
2004 PhD paper: Why Circus Works: how the values and structure of circus make it a significant developmental experience for young people

Death
Reg died unexpectedly while working in Kununurra, Western Australia at the Agricultural Show, "doing what he did best, putting on a great show". His funeral was held at St George's Cathedral in Perth, Western Australia on 29 July 2006, with a celebration of his life held at the Camelot Theatre, Mosman Park on 30 July 2006.

Notes and references

External links
 The Life and Work of Reg Bolton  A tribute website dedicated to social circus pioneer Dr. Reg Bolton (1945–2006) . It includes a photo library, notice board & other archives.

1945 births
2006 deaths
British clowns
Schoolteachers from Kent
People from Margate
Alumni of the University of Warwick